Southmoor station is an light rail station in Denver, Colorado, United States. It is served by the E and H Lines, operated by the Regional Transportation District (RTD), and was opened on November 17, 2006. It is the southernmost station before the Interstate 225 branch splits from the Southeast Corridor and serves as a transfer station for each line.

The station features an interactive piece of public art entitled Harmonic Pass: Denver. Created by Christopher Janney, it features a mixture of light and sound throughout the pedestrian tunnel. Within each column are photoelectric sensors and an audio speaker. Also, a riddle is etched on plaques on both ends of the tunnel. If a person can decipher the riddle and trigger the columns in the pattern described, the tunnel will “dance” a pattern of light and sound in reply.

References 

RTD light rail stations in Denver
Railway stations in the United States opened in 2006
2006 establishments in Colorado